Tom Squires (born 3 August 1993) is a British competitive sailor.

He qualified to represent Great Britain at the 2020 Summer Olympics in Tokyo 2021, competing in men's RS:X.

Early life 
Tom Squires was born on 3 August 1993 in Oxford, Oxfordshire. At early age, he was interested in gardening which made him to later pursue a degree in horticulture.

At the age of 11, his interest in windsurfing began when his father bought an old windsurfer on a family holiday in Pentewan Sands Holiday Park, Cornwall. He enjoyed it so much that they immediately signed him up to the nearest RYA Windsurfing course after they returned home to Oxford.

Career 
Tom Squires made his Olympic debut during the Tokyo 2020 Summer Olympics when he competed in the men's RS:X for Team GB, making him the second British male to ever compete in the RS:X class of windsurfing at an Olympic Games, after Nick Dempsey who competed at the 2008, 2012 and 2016 Games. He finished at the 7th place.

In 2016, he claimed the prestigious Princess Sofia Trophy.

References

 

1993 births
Living people
British male sailors (sport)
Sailors at the 2020 Summer Olympics – RS:X
Olympic sailors of Great Britain
Sportspeople from Oxford
English windsurfers